Prince and the Revolution: Live is a live concert video by Prince and The Revolution. Released after the Purple Rain Tour was complete, the video is a recording of the March 30, 1985 concert at the Carrier Dome in Syracuse, New York. The concert was also broadcast live throughout Europe as the final act of the 15th "Rock Night", an all-night show of four concerts staged by West German public broadcaster Westdeutscher Rundfunk as part of its Rockpalast series that was simulcast by the Eurovision network of European TV stations.

First released on VHS on July 29, 1985, a DVD version was later released with the 2017 deluxe edition of Purple Rain. An audio companion of the concert was released digitally on May 15, 2020. On June 3, 2022, Legacy Recordings in association with NPG Records, reissued the project for the first time in physical audio format (CD and vinyl) and Blu-ray video with remastered video and the audio being remixed by Chris James for both 5.1 surround sound and Dolby Atmos (with the Atmos mix also being issued digitally through select streaming platforms on the same day).

Background

In 1984–85, to capitalise on his growing success with the Purple Rain album, Prince toured the United States extensively to promote the album and sales increased accordingly. Though not on the video, the tour was opened by Apollonia 6 and Sheila E.

Music

Unlike Prince's past tours, which usually opened with older material, Prince now had some #1 hits and chose to open the tour with Purple Rain album opener, "Let's Go Crazy". This segued into a triple-dose from the 1999 album. "Delirious" contained a bit of the extended version of "Let's Go Crazy". "1999" followed. Next came "Little Red Corvette" and audience participation with "Take Me with U".

The pace was slowed down with "Do Me, Baby", introduced by a bit of "Purple House", Prince's take on Jimi Hendrix's "Red House". The ballad was jolted into the funk of B-side, "Irresistible Bitch". The shortened version segued into "Possessed" (which was dedicated to James Brown in the credits). Another audience tease came with "How Come U Don't Call Me Anymore" before a mostly-spoken "Let's Pretend We're Married". A brief "International Lover" was followed by the lengthy ode to the Divine, "God".

The remainder of the concert was dedicated to Purple Rain material. "Computer Blue" (which was heavily based on the original uncut version found on the special deluxe edition of Purple Rain) was followed by "Darling Nikki." On the album, "Darling Nikki" is suffixed by a backward message over rain and storm sounds effects. In the concert, the backward message is played forward. In a twist, a bit of backwards "The Dance Electric" (a Prince-written song for former bandmate André Cymone) introduced "The Beautiful Ones". The song flowed immediately to "When Doves Cry". In post-production, a mirrored camera effect was added to the song to mimic the mirroring in the video for the song. The last three songs followed the album's track listing for side two. Serving as the first of two encores, "I Would Die 4 U" and "Baby I'm a Star" were drawn out into an extended jam session. Sheila E. and her band, Apollonia 6 and Eric Leeds) were also in this section of the show. The last encore was "Purple Rain." Prince played this over 18 minutes which included a longer intro, Wendy encouraging the audience to sing the song's post-chorus "ohh ohh" vocals, and lengthy guitar solos on two of Prince's guitars (both seen in the movie and in videos, including the white Cloud guitar.

Track listing
 "Let's Go Crazy" (5:30)
 "Delirious" (2:46)
 "1999" (4:15)
 "Little Red Corvette" (5:10)
 "Take Me with U" (4:15)
 "Yankee Doodle Dandy" (Interlude) (6:10)
 "Do Me, Baby" (includes "Purple House" spoken intro) (4:40)
 "Irresistible Bitch" (2:00)
 "Possessed" (4:24)
 "How Come U Don't Call Me Anymore" (5:05)
 "Let's Pretend We're Married" (4:15)
 "International Lover" (1:00)
 "God" (8:30)
 "Computer Blue" (4:30)
 "Darling Nikki" (4:00)
 "The Beautiful Ones" (includes backwards "The Dance Electric" and wind chime intro) (7:30)
 "When Doves Cry" (8:15)
 "I Would Die 4 U" (3:50)
 "Baby I'm a Star" (10:00)
 "Purple Rain" (18:24)

 Tracks 1, 5, 14, 15, 16, 17, 18, 19 and 20 taken from Purple Rain
 Tracks 2, 3, 4, 11 and 12 taken from 1999
 Track 7 taken from Controversy
 Tracks 8, 10 and 13 were b-sides for "Let's Pretend We're Married", "1999" and "Purple Rain", respectively, and would later appear on The Hits/The B-Sides
 Track 9 would later be released on Purple Rain Deluxe and 1999 Deluxe
 Track 6 is an interlude

Source:

Personnel

Band
 Prince – lead vocals, guitar, tambourine and keyboards
 Bobby Z. – drums
 Brown Mark – bass guitar
 Wendy Melvoin – guitar
 Lisa Coleman – keyboards
 Dr. Fink – keyboards
 Eric Leeds – saxophone

Guests
 Jerome Benton – dancer
 Greg Brooks – dancer
 Wally Safford – dancer
 Sheila E. – percussion
 Miko Weaver – guitar
 Eddie M. – saxophone
 Juan Escovedo – percussion
 Susie Davis – tambourine
 Apollonia Kotero – vocals, dancer and tambourine
 Susan Moonsie – vocals, dancer and tambourine
 Brenda Bennett – vocals, dancer and tambourine

Charts

References

External links
 

1985 video albums
Prince (musician) video albums
Live video albums